The Deanery of Cedewain is a deanery within the Archdeaconery of Montgomery in the Diocese of St Asaph. It is a large largely upland area between Welshpool and Newtown, which is cut across by the river Severn. It is first mentioned in the Lincoln Taxation of 1291. At that time it consisted of the parishes of Berriew, Bettws Cedewain, Manafon, Llanwyddelan, Tregynon, Newtown, Llanllwchaiarn, Llanmerewig, Llandyssil, and Aberhafesp. The Deanery was reconstituted by an Order in Council in 1849 and further changes in its boundaries occurred in 1882. In 1908 it consisted of  eleven parishes: Aberhafesp, Bettws Cedewain, Dolfor, Kerry, Llandyssil, Llanllwchaiarn, Llanmerewig, Mochdre, Newtown, Sarn and Tregynon.
For administrative purposes Llandyssil is now included in the Deanery of Pool.

References

Church in Wales
Montgomeryshire